Sebastián Tomás Meza (born 14 March 2000) is an Argentine professional footballer who plays as a goalkeeper for Sarmiento, on loan from Huracán.

Career
Meza joined Huracán in 2018, having previously played for hometown team Ex Alumnos Escuela N°185. He signed his first professional contract on 6 March 2020. His unofficial bow came in early October in a friendly versus Talleres. In the succeeding months, Meza was selected on the bench for four Copa de la Liga Profesional matches. After again going unused for a Copa Argentina tie with Estudiantes on 25 February 2021, Meza made his senior debut on 1 March in a Copa de la Liga abandoned encounter with Atlético Tucumán; he was selected to start by Israel Damonte after first-choice Facundo Cambeses suffered a hand injury. On 30 May 2022, Meza joined Sarmiento on loan until June 2023 with a purchase option.

Personal life
On 3 February 2021, it was revealed that Meza - along with eleven Huracán teammates - had tested positive for COVID-19 amid the pandemic.

Career statistics
.

Notes

References

External links

2000 births
Living people
People from Oberá
Argentine footballers
Association football goalkeepers
Sportspeople from Misiones Province
Argentine Primera División players
Club Atlético Huracán footballers
Club Atlético Sarmiento footballers